Chrysogaster is a genus of small hoverflies in the subfamily Eristalinae. They are dark or black with shiny colourful reflections and can often be seen visiting flowers in damp marshy areas where the aquatic larvae live. Species in the related genera Melanogaster, Orthonevra, Lejogaster and Riponnensia were formerly treated as members of Chrysogaster.

Species
Chrysogaster aerosa Loew, 1843
Chrysogaster africana Hull, 1944
Chrysogaster aliniensis Mutin, 1999
Chrysogaster antitheus Walker, 1849
Chrysogaster apicalis Bezzi, 1920
Chrysogaster atlasi Kassebeer, 1999
Chrysogaster basalis Loew, 1857
Chrysogaster cemiteriorum (Linnaeus, 1758)
Chrysogaster curvistylus (Vujić & Stuke, 1998)
Chrysogaster formosana Shiraki, 1930 
Chrysogaster hirtella Loew, 1843
Chrysogaster inflatifrons Shannon, 1916
Chrysogaster jaroslavensis Stackelberg, 1922
Chrysogaster kirgisorum Stackelberg, 1952
Chrysogaster laevigata Bezzi, 1915
Chrysogaster lindbergi Kassebeer, 1999 
Chrysogaster lucida Scopoli, 1763 
Chrysogaster mediterraneus Vujić, 1999
Chrysogaster ocularia Hervé-Bazin, 1914 
Chrysogaster parumplicata Loew, 1840 
Chrysogaster pilocapita Hull, 1944
Chrysogaster poecilophthalma Bezzi, 1908 
Chrysogaster poecilops Bezzi, 1915
Chrysogaster pollinifacies Violovitsh, 1956 
Chrysogaster proserpina Hull, 1944
Chrysogaster quinquestriata Szilády, 1942 
Chrysogaster rondanii Maibach & Goeldlin de Tiefenau, 1995
Chrysogaster semiopaca Matsumura, 1916 
Chrysogaster simplex Loew, 1843
Chrysogaster sinensis Stackelberg, 1952
Chrysogaster solstitialis (Fallén, 1817)
Chrysogaster spiloptera Bezzi, 1915
Chrysogaster stackelbergi Violovitsh, 1978 
Chrysogaster tadzhikorum Stackelberg, 1952
Chrysogaster tumescens Loew, 1873 
Chrysogaster virescens Loew, 1854

References

Hoverfly genera
Eristalinae
Taxa named by Johann Wilhelm Meigen